The 2018 New Orleans Privateers baseball team represented the University of New Orleans (UNO) during the 2018 NCAA Division I baseball season. The Privateers played their home games at Maestri Field at Privateer Park as a member of the Southland Conference. They were led by head coach Blake Dean, in his 3rd season at UNO.

Personnel

Coaching staff

Reference:

Schedule

All rankings from Collegiate Baseball.

Reference:

References

New Orleans Privateers baseball seasons
New Orleans Privateers
New Orelans Privateers baseball